= Central Daylight Time (disambiguation) =

Central Daylight Time (CDT) may refer to

- Australia Central Daylight Time, UTC+11
- Central European Summer Time, UTC+2
- Central Daylight Time (North America), UTC−5
